Aerangis is a genus of orchids (Orchidaceae), containing approximately 57 species.

A

 Aerangis alcicornis
 Aerangis appendiculata
 Aerangis arachnopus
 Aerangis articulata

B

 Aerangis biloba
 Aerangis bouarensis
 Aerangis boutonii
 Aerangis brachycarpa

C

 Aerangis calantha
 Aerangis carnea
 Aerangis x chirioana
 Aerangis citrata
 Aerangis collum-cygni
 Aerangis concavipetala
 Aerangis confusa
 Aerangis coriacea
 Aerangis coursiana
 Aerangis cryptodon

D

 Aerangis decaryana
 Aerangis distincta
 Aerangis divitiflora

E

 Aerangis ellisii

F

 Aerangis fastuosa
 Aerangis flexuosa
 Aerangis fuscata

G

 Aerangis gracillima
 Aerangis gravenreuthii

H

 Aerangis hariotiana
 Aerangis hildebrandtii
 Aerangis hologlottis
 Aerangis humblotii
 Aerangis hyaloides

J

 Aerangis jacksonii

K

 Aerangis kirkii
 Aerangis kotschyana

L

 Aerangis luteoalba
 Aerangis luteoalba var. luteoalba
 Aerangis luteoalba var. rhodosticta

M

 Aerangis macrocentra
 Aerangis maireae
 Aerangis megaphylla
 Aerangis modesta
 Aerangis monantha
 Aerangis montana
 Aerangis mooreana
 Aerangis mystacidii

O

 Aerangis oligantha

P

 Aerangis pallidiflora
 Aerangis x primulina
 Aerangis pulchella
 Aerangis punctata

R

 Aerangis rostellaris

S

 Aerangis seegeri
 Aerangis somalensis
 Aerangis spiculata
 Aerangis splendida
 Aerangis stelligera
 Aerangis stylosa

T

 Aerangis thomsonii

U

 Aerangis ugandensis

V

 Aerangis verdickii
 Aerangis verdickii var. rusituensis
 Aerangis verdickii var. verdickii

Lists of plant species